Scott Matthews (born 8 February 1994) is a Welsh rugby union player who plays for Newport Gwent Dragons regional team as a flanker having previously played for Cross Keys RFC. He is a Wales under-20 international.

References

External links 
Newport Gwent Dragons profile

Rugby union players from Cardiff
Welsh rugby union players
Dragons RFC players
Living people
1994 births
Rugby union flankers